BongaCams is an adult live streaming platform that features content made by webcam models, couples, and camboys. Typical shows include erotic performances that generally involve nudity and provocative yet engaging activities for the viewers; ranging from teasing, stripping, erotic chatting to masturbation with sex toys. All site visitors are able to join online chat rooms, while models earn money by hosting private shows and getting tips from registered users.

Currently, BongaCams is one of the largest adult live streaming platforms in Europe and is ranked as 37th most popular website in the world by Alexa (December 2021). On a global scale, the platform competes with the U.S based platform: Chaturbate.

BongaCash (affiliate program) and BongaModels (model platform) are part of BongaCams community.

History
The domain was registered in 2012.

The website received its first award in 2016 - becoming Best Emerging Live Cam Site at Live Cam Awards 2016.

In December 2016, BongaCams acquired RusCams.com.

In March 2017, they acquired another camming site CamFuze.com.

In January 2017, Maltese newspaper The Malta Independent reported that BongaCams was more popular among the Maltese than Wikipedia.

In December 2017, BongaCams acquired a popular webcam site Runetki.com.

In July 2018, Runet's most popular website smotri.com became a part of BongaCams.

In 2018, BongaCams has launched the Mobile App for models for Android and iOS.

In 2019, BongaCams was recognized as the Best Cam Site at the prestige Venus Awards.

During the 2020 became the most visited webcam site in the world, according to Alexa Global Ranking.

By October 2021, BongaCams won a total of 44 awards.

Awards and nominations

See also
Internet pornography
List of chat websites
List of video hosting services
List of most popular websites
 LiveJasmin
 Chaturbate
 MyFreeCams
 Stripchat
ManyVids
Porn 2.0

References

External links
 

Adult camming websites
Internet properties established in 2012
Dutch erotica and pornography websites
Cypriot erotica and pornography websites